Dinesh Raut (born 1982) is a Nepali film writer, director, producer and songwriter, He is known for I Am Sorry, November Rain (2014 film), Classic (film), Parva and Prasad . Raut is the recipient of several awards, including National Film Awards and many other awards.

Career 
Raut started his career at the age of 14 as a Theater Artist and later he worked as an assistant director in movie “Mero Euta Sathi Cha” before moving into directing. He made his directorial debut with “I am Sorry” (2012). His biggest success to date is November Rain, starring Aaryan Sigdel and Namrata Shrestha from which he received Box Office movies award 2015 Best film director award and CG DCine award 2015 in Best film Director. Raut's Classic (2016) also became a big success at the box office and won the National Film Development Corporation (NFDC) Film Director Award. Also received the Jury award for movie Classic at International Nepalese Artist Society (INAS) Award, 2016. Raut's recent release was “Parva” (2017) starring Koshish Chettri, Namrata Shrestha which also became a huge success in thriller genera. He has written lyrics for his own movies like all songs for November Rain, Kale dai from Parva, Hare Hare from Classic as well as provided the lyrics for many other movies like Bir Bikram, Happy Days and so on.

Awards and nominations

References 

1982 births
Nepalese film directors
Living people
21st-century Nepalese screenwriters
21st-century Nepalese film directors